Walter Dohrn (born December 5, 1970) is an American writer, director, animator, musician, and actor. He performed the voice of Rumpelstiltskin in Shrek Forever After, as well as various characters in Shrek the Third. Dohrn has also worked as writer, director, and storyboard director in Season 2 of SpongeBob SquarePants, and he also worked on 2 episodes from Season 3. In 2020, Dohrn signed a deal with DreamWorks Animation.

Filmography

Film

Television

Video games

References

External links

 

Living people
American male writers
American animators
American animated film directors
American male musicians
American male screenwriters
American male voice actors
American male film actors
American male television actors
American television directors
DreamWorks Animation people
American television writers
American male television writers
1970 births
San Francisco State University alumni